Foster Center is a village in the town of Foster, Rhode Island, United States. It was listed as a census-designated place (CDP) in 2010, with a population of 355. Historic elements of the village are included in the Foster Center Historic District, which was added to the National Register of Historic Places on May 11, 1974. The district features various colonial and Greek Revival houses as well as the still functioning town building from the late 18th century.

Geography
The village is located near the western border of Rhode Island along Rhode Island Route 94, which leads north to West Glocester and south towards Clayville.

Images

See also
National Register of Historic Places listings in Providence County, Rhode Island

References 

Villages in Providence County, Rhode Island
Villages in Rhode Island
Census-designated places in Providence County, Rhode Island
Historic districts in Providence County, Rhode Island
Providence metropolitan area
Foster, Rhode Island
Historic districts on the National Register of Historic Places in Rhode Island
National Register of Historic Places in Providence County, Rhode Island